Kim Jee-Hyuk (born October 26, 1981) is a South Korean football player who, as of 2010 is playing for Gwangju Sangmu.

He was part of the South Korea football team in 2004 Summer Olympics, who finished second in Group A, making it through to the next round, before being defeated by silver medal winners Paraguay.

He was arrested on the charge connected with the match fixing allegations on 7 July 2011.

Club career statistics

References

External links
 
 FIFA Player Record

1981 births
Living people
Association football goalkeepers
South Korean footballers
Busan IPark players
Ulsan Hyundai FC players
Pohang Steelers players
Gimcheon Sangmu FC players
K League 1 players
Footballers at the 2004 Summer Olympics
Olympic footballers of South Korea
Sportspeople from Busan